San Giovanni Lupatoto is a town and comune (municipality) in the Province of Verona in the Italian region Veneto, located about  west of Venice and about  southeast of Verona.

San Giovanni Lupatoto borders the following municipalities: Buttapietra, Oppeano, San Martino Buon Albergo, Verona and Zevio.

Notable people 
 Giovanni Battistoni, footballer
 Marco Marcelliano Marcello, 19th-century composer and writer
 Gastone Moschin, actor
 Bernardo Poli, footballer

Twin towns
 Seyssinet-Pariset, France, since 1986

References

External links
 Official website

Cities and towns in Veneto